Time of Vacation is a 1956 Italian comedy film directed by Antonio Racioppi, at his directorial debut.

For this film Marisa Merlini won a Silver Ribbon for Best supporting Actress.

Plot 
In a hotel in Corniolo, a small village on the outskirts of the city of Rome that has become a tourist resort, the many stories of various people are interwoven. An accountant courts a young lady, pretending to be shy. An aspiring actor asks the waitresses for help to survive. A driver falls in love with a former dancer causing his girlfriend to react. A medical student is ashamed of his father, an honest head waiter.

Cast 
Vittorio De Sica: Il ragionier Aristide Rossi
Giovanna Ralli: Lella, la fidanzata
Memmo Carotenuto: Alfredo, il capo cameriere
Nino Manfredi: Carletto, l'attore
Marisa Merlini: La signorina Margherita Pozzi
Maurizio Arena: Checco, l'autista
Bella Visconti: Silvana
Gabriele Tinti: Luciano, lo studente
Dina Perbellini: La signora Adele
Virgilio Riento: Il frate Serafino
Gildo Bocci: Lo zio Santino
Abbe Lane: Dolores, l'ex ballerina
Edoardo Toniolo: Il signore che protesta e insulta
Antonio Acqua: Il direttore dell'hotel
Roberto Bruni: Fabrizio
Ciccio Barbi: L'ispettore di produzione

References

External links

1956 films
Italian comedy films
Commedia all'italiana
1956 comedy films
Films with screenplays by Age & Scarpelli
1956 directorial debut films
Films scored by Alessandro Cicognini
1950s Italian films
Italian black-and-white films